2018 Czech Lion Awards ceremony was held on 23 March 2019. Nominations were announced on 22 January 2019. Toman has received highest number of nominations. Nominations for television categories were announced on 25 February 2019.

Václav Kopta was announced as host of the ceremony on 6 December 2018. Visual style of the ceremony was presented to public on 6 December 2018. It was created by Dynamo design.

Winter Flies has won highest number of awards including Best film.

Winners and nominees

Non-statutory Awards

References

2018 film awards
Czech Lion Awards ceremonies